Carlo Terzer (born 12 October 1955) is a former Italian male long-distance runner who competed at three editions of the IAAF World Cross Country Championships at senior level (1989, 1990, 1991). He won one national championships at senior level (1988 marathon).

References

External links
 

1955 births
Living people
Italian male long-distance runners
Italian male marathon runners